Ajmer Division is one of the administrative geographical unit, called a division,  of Rajasthan state, India. The division comprises four districts:  Ajmer, Bhilwara, Nagaur, Tonk.

 
Divisions of Rajasthan